Fidelity National Financial, Inc. (NYSE: FNF), a Fortune 500 company, is a provider of title insurance and settlement services to the real estate and mortgage industries. FNF generated approximately $8.469 billion in annual revenue in 2019 from its title and real estate-related operations. Fidelity National Financial, Inc. is currently ranked number 288 on FORTUNE's 2021 list of America's Largest Companies.

See also
 Fidelity National Information Services (currently unaffiliated with Fidelity National Financial, Inc.)

References

External links 
 

 
Companies listed on the New York Stock Exchange
Financial services companies established in 1847
Brooklyn, Jacksonville
American companies established in 1847
Financial services companies based in Jacksonville, Florida
1847 establishments in Florida
Mortgage industry companies of the United States
Publicly traded companies based in Jacksonville, Florida
Multinational companies based in Jacksonville